Gilmore Avenue, formerly known as Gilmore Street, is a two-lane, one-way road in Quezon City, Metro Manila, the Philippines. It runs one-way from Eulogio Rodriguez Sr. Avenue in New Manila and terminates at Nicanor Domingo Street in Valencia, continuing on as the two-way Granada Street until it reaches the city border with San Juan, where it becomes Ortigas Avenue.

The road is named for Eugene Allen Gilmore, Vice Governor-General of the Philippines from 1922 to 1929 who twice served as acting Governor-General. The road is well known as a major IT hub for the number of computer retail shops located at its intersection with Aurora Boulevard.

History
Gilmore Avenue was originally named and constructed sometime before 1943 as Governor Gilmore Street, serving as one of four north-south thoroughfares for the New Manila Subdivisions established a few decades prior. It served as a one-way southbound counterpart to the one-way northbound Pacific Avenue (now Doña Hemady Avenue), which was originally named as a reference to America’s successful acquisition of the Pacific Rim islands that included the Philippines during the Spanish–American War in 1898.

South of the New Manila area, new subdivisions and a shopping center were being developed in what would become the Greenhills area in the municipality of San Juan del Monte, Rizal (now San Juan City, Metro Manila) in the 1960s and 1970s, and so the road became known as a passageway for motorists to Greenhills and Ortigas Avenue itself.

Commercial development
In the 1990s, the Greenhills Shopping Center became known as a hub for computer parts and accessories at affordable prices for computer hobbyists and IT enthusiasts alike until the computer boom in the 1990s made computers mainstream and increased the demand for computer retail markets. As the Greenhills Shopping Center had become too crowded for the increasing demand of the computer boom, a computer retail store owner in 1997 decided to set up shop along the once-desolate Gilmore Avenue.

According to local computer retailer PC Options, the business was the first computer retail store to open in the area, claiming that contrary to popular belief, the "PC" in the name does not actually refer to personal computers, but rather, coincidentally was the initials of the shop's founder and owner. As the area was being developed commercially, PC Options became popular for pioneering the do-it-yourself concept for computer customizations in the local market, serving as the catalyst for other computer retail shops to open in the area.

As several computer shops in Greenhills had to close down due to renovations at the shopping center itself, Gilmore became established as a major IT hub in Metro Manila, with the Gilmore name becoming synonymous to computer retail.

No-contact apprehension controversy

On July 1, 2022, the Quezon City government began fully implementing its No Contact Apprehension Policy on several major roads in the city. As a result, closed-circuit television cameras were installed along the intersection of E. Rodriguez Sr. Avenue and Gilmore Avenue.

However, the policy has been criticized by motorists due to the unclear directives on the proper way to navigate the intersection correctly. In particular, motorists complained on social media after they were ticketed for turning "in the wrong lane" towards Gilmore Avenue, where the rightmost lane along E. Rodriguez Sr. Avenue is cut in half by Quezon City's bike lane network.

Route description
Gilmore Avenue is a major thoroughfare that acts as a southbound corridor for connecting the neighborhoods of New Manila and the neighborhood and commercial area along Tomas Morato Avenue to Ortigas Avenue, the cities of San Juan and Mandaluyong, and the Greenhills Shopping Center.

Its segment within New Manila from E. Rodriguez Sr. Avenue to Aurora Boulevard is notorious for many vehicular accidents, with an average of 0.1 to 0.3 accidents per day and 91.9 accidents a year. Many of these accidents are attributed towards overspeeding, improper overtaking, and disregarding of traffic signs as a result of the wide single-direction lane width, and due to poor visibility during night time.

Landmarks

Computer and IT hub
The Aurora Boulevard intersection of Gilmore Avenue is a popular hub for IT-related products and services for computers and related components. Both the southern corners of Gilmore Avenue and Aurora Boulevard are filled with stores selling different kinds of computers and their accessories, both secondhand and brand-new.

Due to the COVID-19 pandemic in the Philippines, computer retail stores in the area reported a five-fold increase in demand for laptops and computers due to remote work and distance education arrangements.

Nearby transport
Bus Route 11 (Gilmore-Taytay) serves the commercialized section of Gilmore Avenue, with its northern namesake terminus being located at the intersection of Gilmore Avenue and Nicanor Domingo Street. It is also served by Bus Route 10 (Doroteo Jose-Cubao), which stops at the intersection of Gilmore Avenue and Aurora Boulevard Route 6 (Quezon City Hall-Gilmore) of the Quezon City Bus Service has a stop in the Gilmore commercial area and a terminal at the nearby Robinsons Magnolia along Doña Hemady Avenue.

The nearest mass transport station from Gilmore Avenue is the Gilmore station of the Manila LRT Line 2, which was named after the road itself, and the future N. Domingo station of the MRT-4 monorail line.

The segment of Gilmore Avenue from Aurora Boulevard to Nicanor Domingo Street also contains a one-way partially-protected bike lane, linking the bike lane network along Aurora Boulevard and Granada Street.

References

Streets in Quezon City